The province of Pordenone was a province in the autonomous region of Friuli-Venezia Giulia in Italy. Its capital was the city of Pordenone. The province was subdivided from the province of Udine in 1968. It had a total population of 312,794 inhabitants. The province was abolished on 30 September 2017.

History
Pordenone was settled before 2000 BCE and was situated along the boundary between Villanovan culture and Alpine Hallstatt culture. It was under the rule of Treviso during the Middle Ages, although it was sacked by Aquileian soldiers in 1233 CE. The Austrian House of Habsburg subsequently ruled the area between 1278 and 1508, although the land surrounding it was briefly entirely under the rule of Venice. In the 15th century it was an important centre for the production of paper, textiles, ceramics, silk, and wool, and attracted Tuscan merchants.

In 1508, Venice occupied the city in response to calls from pro-Venetian residents of Pordenone, but this occupation was not well received. It fell under the rule of Bartolomeo d'Alviano after this occupation until 1537, when Venice invaded the city. It was left under Venetian rule until the invasion of the area by Napoleon in 1797; it was later controlled by Austria between 1813 and 1866. In 1866, it was conquered by the Kingdom of Italy. It was the third Italian city to use hydroelectric power, after Milan and Tivoli, in 1888. It was occupied by Austrians during World War I, and it was bombed forty-three times in World War II.

Geography
The province of Pordenone is the westernmost of the four provinces in the autonomous region of Friuli-Venezia Giulia in northeastern Italy. It is bounded to the east and north by the Province of Udine. To the west lies the Province of Belluno, to the southwest the Province of Treviso and to the south, the Province of Venice, all in the region of Veneto. The province is located in the lowlands of the Po-Venetian Valley, south of the Venetian Prealps and the Alpine foothills of Friuli. It is the only province in the autonomous region that does not border on the Adriatic Sea. The provincial capital is the city of Pordenone, an ancient port on the River Noncello.

Hilly country in the north of the province give way further south to the flat land of the lower Po Valley. Rivers cross the province from north to south carrying runoff from the melting snow in the Alps. Much of the water sinks underground and resurfaces on the plains as a zone of springs.

Foreign community
The top 10 countries of origin of the inhabitants of Pordenone with foreign citizenship at 31 December 2010 were:
 Romania 8630
 Albania 6321
 Ghana 3489
 India 1821
 Morocco 1760
 Ukraine 1308
 Macedonia 1044
 Bangladesh 970
 Moldova 913
 Burkina Faso 826

References

External links
 Official website 

 
Pordenone